The 1959 Major League Baseball season was played from April 9 to October 9, 1959. It saw the Los Angeles Dodgers, free of the strife produced by their move from Brooklyn the previous season, rebound to win the National League pennant after a two-game playoff against the Milwaukee Braves, who themselves had moved from Boston in 1953. The Dodgers won the World Series against a Chicago White Sox team that had not played in the "Fall Classic" since 1919 and was interrupting a Yankees' dynasty that dominated the American League between 1949 and 1964.

The season is notable as the only one between 1950 and 1981 where no pitcher pitched a no-hitter.

Awards and honors
Baseball Hall of Fame
Zack Wheat
Most Valuable Player
Nellie Fox, Chicago White Sox (AL) 
Ernie Banks, Chicago Cubs (NL)
Cy Young Award
Early Wynn, Chicago White Sox (AL)  
Rookie of the Year 
Bob Allison, Washington Senators (AL)
Willie McCovey, San Francisco Giants (NL)
Gold Glove Award
Bobby Shantz (P) New York Yankees (AL) 
Sherm Lollar (C) Chicago White Sox (AL) 
Vic Power (1B) Cleveland Indians (AL) 
Nellie Fox (2B) Chicago White Sox (AL) 
Frank Malzone (3B) Boston Red Sox (AL) 
Luis Aparicio (SS) Chicago White Sox (AL) 
Minnie Miñoso (OF) Cleveland Indians (AL) 
Al Kaline (OF) Detroit Tigers (AL) 
Jackie Jensen (OF) Boston Red Sox (AL)

Statistical leaders

Standings

American League

National League

  The Los Angeles Dodgers defeated the Milwaukee Braves in best-of-three playoff series to earn the National League pennant.

Postseason

Bracket

Managers

American League

National League

Home Field Attendance

Highlights

April 22 - In the course of a 20-6 victory over the Kansas City Athletics, the Chicago White Sox scored 11 runs in the seventh inning on ten walks, a hit batter, three errors and just one hit.

Events
 1959 Major League Baseball All-Star Game (first game)
 1959 Major League Baseball All-Star Game (second game)
 Baseball Hall of Fame balloting, 1959
 1959 National League tie-breaker series
 1959 World Series

See also
1959 Nippon Professional Baseball season

Notes
Other Major League Baseball seasons since 1901 without a no-hitter pitched are 1909, 1913, 1921, 1927–1928, 1932–1933, 1936, 1939, 1942–1943, 1949, 1982, 1985, 1989, 2000 and 2005.

References

External links
1959 Major League Baseball season schedule

 
Major League Baseball seasons